Francesco Gabriele Frola is an Italian ballet dancer. He joined the National Ballet of Canada in 2010, and in 2018, he was promoted to principal dancer, the highest rank in the company. The same year, he joined the English National Ballet as a principal dancer, while keeping his position in Canada. In 2020, the English National Ballet promoted him to lead principal, and he started to dance with the company full-time.

Early life
Frola was born in Aosta, to two former dancers. He started ballet at age three at his parents' school, Professione Danza in Parma. When he was 15, he competed at the Prix de Lausanne and was awarded a scholarship to The School of The Hamburg Ballet in Germany, then switched to Fomento Artistico Cordobés, Mexico, to train with a teacher who also taught his parents.

Career
In 2010, Frola competed at the Prix de Lausanne again, though he did not enter the final, he was given an apprenticeship to the National Ballet of Canada, and joined the corps de ballet the following year. He was soon given soloist roles in Nijinsky and Giselle, and principal roles including the title role in Nijinsky and Lescaut in Manon. In 2015, whilst still in the corps de ballet, he was originally scheduled to dance Prince Florimund in The Sleeping Beauty with Elena Lobsanova, but when she was injured, he danced it with company star Svetlana Lunkina instead, and was promoted to first soloist the same year. In 2018, he was promoted to principal dancer, the highest rank in the company, and joined English National Ballet, while keeping his position in Canada. In 2020, ENB promoted him to lead principal dancer. The National Ballet of Canada then announced Frola would dance with ENB full-time, but intend to return as a guest artist.

References

Living people
Year of birth missing (living people)
Dancers from Parma
Italian male ballet dancers
National Ballet of Canada principal dancers
English National Ballet principal dancers
Italian expatriates in Canada
21st-century Italian ballet dancers